Juan Carlos Bello (born 6 January 1949) is a Peruvian former butterfly, freestyle and medley swimmer. He competed at the 1968 Summer Olympics and the 1972 Summer Olympics.

References

External links
 

1949 births
Living people
People from Islay Province
Peruvian male butterfly swimmers
Peruvian male freestyle swimmers
Peruvian male medley swimmers
Olympic swimmers of Peru
Swimmers at the 1968 Summer Olympics
Swimmers at the 1972 Summer Olympics
20th-century Peruvian people